Robert (Boris) Bitker (1907 - 1977) was a military commander of the Zionist paramilitary group Irgun. He was born in Warsaw, Poland and attended a Catholic high school. At 19, he was drafted into the Polish Army, but soon fled to Russia where he fought in the White Army under Kolchak during the Russian Revolution of 1917. In the early 1920s, he emigrated to the U.S., and lived briefly in Los Angeles where he worked in the film industry. From the U.S. he went to Shanghai, China, where he joined the Revisionist Zionist movement and was one of the originators of the Jewish battalion in the volunteer corps in Shanghai which was commanded by the British. 

In 1933, he was appointed head (netziv) of the Betar command in southern China. In 1937, he went to Palestine, where he was appointed Commander-in-Chief of the Irgun. He held this position for a short time, and was quickly replaced after difficulties arose from two of his operations. 

Bitker, taken up a practice adopted by Russian revolutionaries, considered bank robbery a means of obtaining funding for operations, and to this end, with ex-members of Brit HaBiryonim, he staged a bank robbery that went wrong. Biker was also involved in the case of Zvi Frenkel, an Irgun militant who had killed an Arab in an act of retaliation using a gun he held illegally. After being identified, he was hidden by the Irgun while British arrested his mother and spread rumours she was being tortured, which convinced him to turn himself in. According to Binyamin Eliav, Bitker was involved in the decision to have him killed because of worries that Frenkel might reveal details about Irgun's members. Frenkel was later found, drowned while bound with wire in the Yarkon River

Bitker was then smuggled out of Palestine and returned to Shanghai, where he led the local Betar group before emigrating to the United States, where he lived for the rest of his life.

References

1907 births
1977 deaths
Betar members
Irgun members
Military personnel from Warsaw
Polish Zionists
Mandatory Palestine emigrants to the United States